Human? is an anthology of science fiction and fantasy stories edited by Judith Merril, published as a paperback original by Lion Books in 1954. No further editions were issued.

Contents
 "Introduction", Fredric Brown
 "I: As Others See Us…", Judith Merril 
 "The Big Contest", John D. MacDonald (Worlds Beyond 1950)
 "The Boy Next Door", Chad Oliver (F&SF 1951)
 "Take a Seat", Eric Frank Russell (Startling Stories 1952)
 "An Egg a Month from All Over", Idris Seabright (F&SF 1952)
 "Riya’s Foundling", Algis Budrys (Science Fiction Stories #1 1953)
 "II: Earthlings All", Judith Merril
 "ghosts", Don Marquis (Archy and Mehitabel, 1927)
 "Smoke Ghost", Fritz Leiber (Unknown 1941)
 "Who Shall I Say Is Calling?", August Derleth (F&SF 1952)
 "The Gnarly Man", L. Sprague de Camp (Unknown 1939)
 "The Temptation of Harringay", H. G. Wells (The St. James’s Gazette 1895)
 "The Ultimate Egoist", Theodore Sturgeon (Unknown 1941)
 "Rope Enough", John Collier (The New Yorker 1939)
 "III: Tomorrow Will Be Better?", Judith Merril
 "Liar!", Isaac Asimov (Astounding 1941)
 "Who Knows His Brother", Graham Doar (Startling Stories 1952)
 "Crucifixus Etiam", Walter M. Miller, Jr. (Astounding 1953)

Reception
P. Schuyler Miller, declaring that Merril "has [n]ever edited a bad anthology, or even a so-so one", described this theme anthology as "span[ning] the gap from H. G. Wells to 1953."

References

1954 anthologies
Fantasy anthologies
Science fiction anthologies